Guanyin is a town in Yunxi County, Hubei province, China. Guanyin has a population of 32,135 as of 2010, and administers 22 villages.

Administrative divisions 
, it has 22 villages under its administration: 
Guanyin Village
Longqiao Village
Liujiawan Village
Pengjiawan Village
Niu'ershan Village
Goukou Village
Zhonggou Village
Zhifanggou Village
Tianhekou Village
Yaziwan Village
Huomaigou Village
Huangtuliang Village
Xiangou Village
Zhicao Village
Xiataoyuan Village
Wanshousi Village
Fodong Village
Shuangzhangping Village
Nangou Village
Tulinggou Village
Songshuping Village
Wudingping Village

Demographics 
Guanyin has a population of 32,135 according to the 2010 Chinese Census, up from the 27, 813 recorded in the 2000 Chinese Census.

The town has a hukou population of 39,742 as of 2019, up slightly from 39,564 in 2018.

See also 
 List of township-level divisions of Hubei

References 

Township-level divisions of Hubei
Yunxi County